Minuscule 378 (in the Gregory-Aland numbering), α 258 (Soden), is a Greek minuscule manuscript of the New Testament, on parchment. Palaeographically it has been assigned to the 13th century. Formerly it was labelled by 56a, 227p. 
It has some marginalia.

Description 
The codex contains the text of the Acts of the Apostles, Catholic epistles, and Pauline epistles on 221 parchment leaves with one lacuna (Acts 10:15-36). The text is written in one column per page, in 26-31 lines per page.

Text 
The Greek text of the codex is a representative of the Byzantine text-type (except Catholic epistles). Aland placed it in Category V (except Catholic epistles). The text of the Catholic epistles has higher value, Aland placed it in III Category.

History 

The manuscript once belonged to John Metelli. The manuscript was added to the list of New Testament manuscripts by Scholz (1794-1852).
C. R. Gregory saw it in 1886.

The manuscript was added to the list of the New Testament manuscripts by Scholz (1794-1852).

Formerly it was labelled by 56a, 227p. In 1908 Gregory gave the number 378 to it.

The manuscript is currently housed at the Bodleian Library (MS. E. D. Clarke 4) in Oxford.

See also 

 List of New Testament minuscules
 Biblical manuscript
 Textual criticism

References

Further reading 

 

Greek New Testament minuscules
13th-century biblical manuscripts
Bodleian Library collection